Li & Fung Limited is a Hong Kong-based supply chain management company. Founded in 1906, the company experienced near-exponential growth since it first went public in 1973 by being the “go-to source” for apparel, toys, and other consumer goods manufacturing for western brands and retailers, reaching its peak market capitalization in 2011. For decades, Li & Fung provided product design, raw material sourcing, and manufacturing services to some of the biggest retailers in North America and Europe, but a global economic slowdown affected these retailers, leading to lower profits for the then-publicly traded company. Between 2011 and 2020, the company lost 95% of its market value with its turnover almost halving. The decline has been attributed to the Internet and the rise of e-commerce and the resulting subsequent closing of specialty and department stores, specifically the rise of Alibaba which connected Chinese manufacturers with buyers directly, but also Amazon which encroached into the business of brick & mortar resellers that Li & Fung served. 

On 13 February 2017, as part of the index manager’s quarterly review, Li & Fung was removed from the blue chip index: Hang Seng Index and replaced by Geely Auto. In 2020, reports emerged that the company had been struggling to turn its century-old business around for years. The US-China trade wars and the coronavirus pandemic in 2020 didn’t help; in March of 2020, Li & Fung announced its intention to privatize. In May 2021, the company was delisted after 28 years on the Hong Kong Stock Exchange, the decision attributed to the length of time associated with executing the restructuring and technology investments required to transform its business.

In 2020, the Fung family privatized the company with a 94 percent stock price loss (HKD 1.25) from its best performance back in 2011 (HKD 21.319). A massive restructuring took place after the privatization that reportedly reduced 70% of staff globally leading to employee protests at the entrance of the Hong Kong office and claims of unlawful dismissals in the Bangladesh office. The company has also been accused of not paying suppliers together with a long list of retailers.

A few days prior to Li & Fung's use of a coupon step-up that was announced on August 12, 2020, Li & Fung announced a USD 100M investment from JD.com

History

1906–1970 Setting the Foundation 
Li & Fung was founded in 1906, in Guangzhou (at that time transliterated as Canton) by Fung Pak-liu (d. 1943), an English teacher and opium dealer, and Li To-ming, a local merchant whose family owned a porcelain shop. It started as an export trading company, exporting porcelain, fireworks, jade handicrafts and silk mainly to the United States. Much of its early activity was acting as Comprador a buyer's broker for larger more established American and European clients.

In 1937, Fung's son Fung Hon-chu opened the company's first branch office outside of mainland China in British Hong Kong. It was incorporated later that year in Hong Kong. Li sold his 300 shares of the company in 1946 leaving the company in the hands of the Fung family. In 1951, due to a United Nations trade embargo on China, Hong Kong started manufacturing textiles and plastics. With this change, Li & Fung began exporting garments, toys, wigs and plastic flowers.

1970-2000 Modernization and Growth 
By the early 1970s, Li & Fung's broker role was being squeezed by both manufacturers and importers, the rise of competing Asian Tiger economies as low-cost production locations and major Western retailers engaging directly with Asian suppliers. William and Victor Fung, the sons of Fung Hon-chu, returned from the US to work on modernizing the company. Starting in China and Asia, sources from countries closer to target markets were sought out: Mexico, Honduras and Guatemala, for the US; Turkey, Egypt and Tunisia for Europe.

In 1973, Li & Fung was listed on the Stock Exchange of Hong Kong. In 1988 the Group was privatized and streamlined, incorporated in Bermuda in 1991, and its trading activities were listed on the HKSE in July 1992.

In 1995, Li & Fung acquired Inchcape Buying Services (formerly known as Dodwell & Co.). It was part of Inchcape plc, a British trading company with a network of offices in India, Pakistan, Bangladesh, and Sri Lanka. The acquisition of Inchcape Buying Services expanded the company's customer base while simultaneously shifting its sourcing network beyond East Asia to include the Indian sub-continent, the Mediterranean, and Caribbean basins. Four years later, in 1999, Li & Fung acquired Swire & Maclaine and Camberley.

2000-2013 Opening a War Chest for Acquisitions

In 2000, Li & Fung became a constituent member of the Hang Seng Index and acquired the Colby Group in a HK$2.2 billion deal. Bruce Rockowitz joined the company, serving as its CEO and president between 2004 and 2014.

In 2006, Li & Fung started on a growth strategy through acquisition and proceeded to raise HK$2.723 billion by a top-up share placement. In an estimated deal worth Euro 100 million, the company acquired KarstadtQuelle International Services, a global sourcing arm of KarstadtQuelle, Europe's largest department store and mail order group. The company also acquired US apparel producer Oxford Womenswear Group for US$37.3 million and Rosetti Handbags and Accessories, a US firm that supplies purses to retailers, for US$162 million.

In 2007, Regatta USA LLC was acquired for US$145 million. CGroup, a health, beauty and cosmetic (HBC) supply chain business, was acquired for US$120 million. American Marketing Enterprises Inc, known as AME and its related companies, a sleepwear specialist was acquired for US$128 million to form LF USA. Tommy Hilfiger's global sourcing operations, headquartered in Hong Kong was also acquired for US$247.8 million in cash.

In 2008, the company acquired Bruce Makowsky's fashion business including its flagship brands Kathy Van Zeeland Handbags, B. Makowsky and Tignanello for $330 million. Peter Black, a Yorkshire-based shoe manufacturer which supplied Marks & Spencer, was bought for £48.1m. Slivereed, an apparel/textiles company and Wilson & Wong Trading for an undisclosed amount. In the same year Miles Fashion Group, a leading German supplier was acquired for US$51 million. Singapore's Temasek Holdings bought 4.62% of Li & Fung for HK$3.88 billion, funds of which were used for further acquisitions.

In 2009, Wear Me Apparel, a US children's clothing company was acquired for up to US$401.2 million. Jason Rabin, President of Wear Me Apparel joined Li & Fung with the acquisition. Liz Claiborne's sourcing operation was purchased for US$83 million in February and Shubiz, a UK wholesaler of clothing and accessories was acquired for US$15 million in March. In May, the company sold US$350 million in shares at a discount to raise capital for further M&A deals.

In 2010, Li & Fung acquired Hong Kong listed (2387.HK) Integrated Distribution Services Group Ltd (IDS) for US$902 million. IDS Logistics business was rebranded to LF Logistics. Visage Group Ltd, a private-label apparel supplier in the UK was also acquired for 173 million pounds ($264.1 million) to build a European platform. In the same year they also acquired Hong Kong-based Jackel Group, Hong Kong-based HTP Group, and acquired substantially all of the assets of Cipriani Accessories Inc. and its affiliate, The Max Leather Group totalling US$140 million. Closing the year, the company finalized the purchase of U.S.-based footwear maker Jimlar Corporation and a Chinese furniture manufacturer Kenas Furniture Group.

In 2011, a share placement in March was used to raise a net proceed of HK$3.89 billion to fund general working capital and future business development and acquisitions, with an ample funded war chest, the M&A spree continued with another 19 companies acquired that is expected to generate approximately $2 billion annualized turnover for the Li & Fung. The 19 companies include Oxford Apparel bought for US$121.7 million, children's apparel firm Fishman & Tobin Inc., costume jewelry company Crimzon Rose International, clothing supplier Loyaltex Apparel, color cosmetics maker Collection 2000, Thailand-based furniture trading company Exim Designs, TVMania and Hampshire Designers. The stock price peaked on 24 January 2011 at HKD 21.319.

In 2012, Walmart announced they were taking sourcing back in-house only 2 years after creating the Direct Sourcing Group (DSG) with Li & Fung that was estimated to be worth $2 billion of sourced goods in 2010. A share top-up placement executed in March raised US$504 million (HK$3.91 billion)

In 2013, Lornamead Acquisitions Limited and its subsidiaries ("Lornamead") who owns and manages a portfolio of traditional and heritage U.S., German and U.K. personal care brands was acquired for US$190 million.

2014–2019 Downward Spiral, Disposals, Besmirched Reputation and Steady Losses 

In 2014, Spencer Fung, son of Victor Fung, became Group CEO and Marc Compagnon was named Group President as Li & Fung spun out its global brands and licensing business through a one-to-one stock split. With the spin off Bruce Rockowitz became Chief Executive of Global Brands Group (787.HK), listed on the Stock Exchange of Hong Kong as a separate entity in July. Li & Fung acquired freight forwarding company China Container Line. For the new 3 year plan between 2014 and 2016, Li & Fung announced the growth strategy will be changed from M&A to focus on organic growth, marking an end to 8 years of large scale acquisitions. Turnover excluding Global Brands Group peaked at US$19,288 million.

In 2015, Li & Fung entered into a joint venture with two department store operators in China, Beijing Wangfujing Department Store Group Co Ltd and Shanghai Bailian, with the aim of setting up as many as 300 stores and developing its own private labels. Four years after the joint venture was announced, of the planned 300 stores, under 5 stores were opened and the sun finally set permanently without fanfare on this venture in 2019. As with all its other failed ventures, no public announcement was made regarding the collapse of this venture.

In 2016, Li & Fung announced it sold LF Asia Distribution, its non-core consumer and healthcare distribution business to Dah Chong Hong for US$350 million. At the end of the 2014-2016 3 year plan, the company missed targets and saw both revenue and profits falling 3 years consecutively with 2016 alone seeing a 47% drop in profit.

With effect from 6 March 2017, Li & Fung was removed from Hang Seng Index as a constituent (Blue Chip stock) and replaced by Geely Automobile. In the same year, Li & Fung entered into a strategic transaction between Hony Capital and the Fung Group whom acquire three of its vertical product businesses, furniture (Whalen), sweaters (Cobalt Fashion) and beauty (MEIYUME), for an estimated cash price of $1.1 billion. Turnover and profits in these three vertical products business have been declining in recent years such that a one-time accounting loss of US$610 million to accommodate write-downs related to the disposal was required of Li & Fung.

In 2018, core operation profit dropped by 20%.

In 2019, LF Logistics postponed the previously proposed spin-off initial public offering with Temasek Holdings of Singapore investing US$300 million for a 21.7% stake in LF Logistics. Li & Fung will hold the remaining 78.3%. This deal values LF Logistics at US$1.38 billion, the market cap of Li & Fung at the point of the deal was approximately US$1.25 billion, leading to the understanding that Li & Fung core sourcing business has a negative valuation. Record store closures and customer bankruptcies led to another 20% decrease in core operation profit.

Circa 2020, it has been struggling to turn its century-old business around by itself over the last few years

2020 and beyond 
In April 2021, a separate and new company called LFX was announced with the CFO of Li & Fung taking the helm in the new company.

In December 2021, LF Logistics was sold to container shipping giant Maersk for US$3.6 billion in an all-cash deal. The former minority shareholders has requested the Securities and Futures Commission investigate the sale of the LF Logistics as it was 4 times the value of the LF privatization deal.

In September 2022, after years of struggled restructuring under the reign of Fung Family and after completed sale of LF Logistics to Maersk, Li & Fung Limited and its credit rating was unsurpisingly placed on review for downgrade by Moody’s Investors Service. In further elaboration, Moody’s Investors Service cited that, “The review for downgrade reflects Li & Fung’s significantly weakened business profile and reduced earnings base after the transaction, which will more than offset a likely material improvement in its net financial leverage,” and "...there is a degree of uncertainty over whether the company can sustain such a positive trend over the next 2-to-3 years,"

COVID-19 Response

Public Display of Goodwill and Charity
In February 2020, media outlets reported Circle K stores, part of the Li & Fung parent company, Fung Group, drawing massive crowds as chain gives away 100,000 free masks to Hong Kong's elderly

Internal Cost-Cutting Measures
In June 2020, Li & Fung dismissed 70 Percent of procurement staff attributing it publicly as restructuring and the impact of COVID-19.

Sustainability

Partnership and initiatives
Li & Fung is a founding member of the Sustainable Apparel Coalition (SAC) and has been involved in the development of the Higg Index. The Index helps organizations standardize how they measure and evaluate environmental performance of apparel products across the supply chain at the brand, product, and facility levels. Li & Fung offered consultation service offering(s) for vendors to "upgrade" factories and "help them navigate supply chain complexity and compliance demands."

In 2012, Li & Fung, through the Fung Group, started working with the Business for Social Responsibility (BSR) to train female workers in Bangladeshi factories in the basics of health, nutrition and financial planning. They later extended the HERProject to Cambodia, India and Vietnam.

Between 2011 and 2014, Li & Fung supported CARE International's Hemaya project. The project targets women working in garment factories in Qualified Industrial Zones (QIZs) around the northern cities of Irbid, Al Mafraq and Az Zarqa, where many textile factories are located. Hemaya is part of a larger effort by CARE Jordan to promote linkages between local employment opportunities and the local female workforce in the face of Jordan's low rate of female participation in the workforce which has one of the lowest in the world. Li & Fung barely sources from Jordan and where majority of its sourcing is, there are currently no efforts to improve the lives of those millions of workers there.

Criticism

Tazreen Fire (2012) and Rana Plaza Collapse (2013)
Following the Tazreen Fire in 2012 and Rana Plaza collapse in 2013, attention was drawn to the role of Li & Fung as a supply chain intermediary in factory sourcing and its influence on worker rights and safety. Immediately following the incident, the company formed safety task force composed of engineers and fire safety experts to develop in-house safety improvements of listed factories and became signatories of Accord and Alliance for Safety in Bangladesh RMG, which ceased operations effective December 31, 2018. Since many have forgotten about the incident, Li & Fung too is no longer signatory of the Accord and Alliance for Safety in Bangladesh RMG

Labor Violation, Suppliers Can't Breathe
In August 2013, The New York Times reported that Li & Fung's "great bargaining power" allowed it to pressure suppliers and manufacturers to lower costs, often utilizing a "take it or leave it" approach when it made an offer. Critics said that factories would cut corners in order to meet the offer. The article also said that Li & Fung had been tied to labor violations and had been accused by activists of depressing wages in developing countries and failing to investigate factory conditions.

Preventing Workers from Obtaining Living Wage
In December 2014, a Clark University paper criticized the company's network of suppliers as a "dispersion" strategy that was contradictory to worker safety. The paper concluded that this strategy prevented workers from obtaining a living wage and would always encourage buyers to use factories based in countries with weak government enforcement of regulation.

Growth by Acquisition has not brought the expected value 
In a 2014 article by the Financial Times, Li & Fung has incurred a total cost of acquisitions (included performance-related payments) of up to US$7 billion between 2006 and 2014. With the explosive revenue growth from US$4 billion to US$16 billion, the top line has only increased by a mere 30%. The article also goes on to explain how the acquisitions have barely added much value to Li & Fung. The synergies expected from the acquisitions have not materialized, critics say a refocus on the core business is necessary.

Overpaid CEO, Large Shareholder Losses
In an 2020 analysis by SimplyWallSt looking at CEO pay, it concluded that despite falling turnover and disappointing earnings per share, CEO compensation has been higher than market norms and thus overpaid.

During the privatization process, the small shareholder alliance, composed of more than a dozen people, filed a complaint to the Securities Regulatory Commission. They claimed that some shareholders had applied to the bank or securities firm to attend the voting, but had not been issued with the privatization voting form, which prevented them from participating in the voting process. Chairman William Fung Kwok-lun said that buying other stocks could generate higher returns than investing in Li & Fung.

Taxation FAQ
In 2020, two issues were taken to the Inland Revenue Department (Hong Kong). The first issue was whether (Li & Fung Trading) LFT's profits relating to goods sourced from suppliers located in places other than Hong Kong, Mainland of China and Macau were offshore and so not chargeable to profits tax. The second issue was whether LFT's deduction of a marketing commission paid to its holding company incorporated in the British Virgin Islands from onshore profits was caught by the anti-avoidance provisions in sections 61 and 61A of the Inland Revenue Ordinance.

Case studies
In his chapter entitled Li & Fung, Ltd.: An agent of global production (2001), Cheng used Li & Fung Ltd. as a case study in the international production fragmentation trade theory through which producers in different countries are allocated a specialized slice or segment of the value chain of the global production. Allocations are determined based on "technical feasibility" and the ability to keep the lowest final price possible for each product.

In his chapter on platforms in the report "Business ecosystems come of age" (2015), John Hagel III uses Li & Fung as an example of a "pull platform" that connects participants with the "capabilities of others and make them available to their customers in ways that create significant value for platform participants and customers." He writes that pull platforms are scalable and instead of becoming "unwieldy with greater numbers of participants, they become only more capable and valuable." He says pull platforms are important owing to two factors: digitization and globalization. Although companies have seen the benefits in terms of lean manufacturing and inventory management, within well defined supply chains, the real potential of the pull-based approach has yet to be realized.

In 2017, shortly before Li & Fung was "unceremoniously removed from the Hang Seng Index", a post on Harvard Business School's Digital Initiative accurately assessed the downfall of Li & Fung's Digital Platform

Three-Year Plan
Li & Fung's Three-Year Plans have been the subject of numerous case studies and books written on the organization. In 2014, Harvard Business school published a case study to address questions raised on the company's strategies pursued to meet unrealistic targets, and on the validity of its Three-Year Planning process.

Li & Fung ceased its Three-Year Plans, making the 2017–2019 Three-Year Plan the final plan in its history.

See also

 List of trading companies

References

External links
 
 
Fung Business Intelligence

 
Companies listed on the Hong Kong Stock Exchange
Conglomerate companies of China
Logistics companies of Hong Kong
Trading companies of Hong Kong
Transport companies of Hong Kong
Conglomerate companies of Hong Kong
Former companies in the Hang Seng Index
Family-owned companies of Hong Kong
Offshore companies of Bermuda